Sri Viswa Viznana Vidya Adhyatmika Peetham is a theosophical congregation which states that it is based on the principles of oneness of God, and discovering divinity in the self. The ashram is situated in Pithapuram, East Godavari district, Andhra Pradesh, India.

History

Sri Viswa Viznana Vidya Adhyatmika Peetham was established in Baghdad. It moved to Delhi, India in 1472, where it became involved in court circles of the Mughal Empire. The beheading of Sarmad by the Mughal emperor Aurangzeb in 1661 created a rift with the congregation. The leader, Sri Madin Kabir Sha, moved the institution from Delhi to Hyderabad. King Abul Hasan Qutb Shah of Golkonda gave two jagirs to the congregation in Tuni.

The Old Ashram is located near the Pithapuram railway station at 

The New Ashram is located on Pithapuram to Kakinada road at Chitrada

Aims
The objectives of this Peetham are said to be based mainly on Sufi philosophy, but the Peethadhipathis also practice the Hindu Philosophy of Dharma, and study the Hindu scriptures, the Quran, and the Bible, with the goal of extract the essence of all the major three religions. Monotheism has become its main plank. The professed aims of Sri Viswa Viznana Vidya Adhyatmika Peetham include:

 To enlighten the human soul with secrets of divinity.
 To transform followers into model citizens, fulfilling ones noble birth as human beings.
 To provide peace of mind by conferring soul power to the oppressed and depressed.
 To rend the veil of illusion of human soul, administer tranquility and transform man into divinity.
 To teach and preach monotheism, surpassing all hurdles of caste, creed, race, religion and sex through the medium of the noblest guru and to impart that philosophy in the form of lessons to the members.
 To propagate this science of philosophy for the total welfare of mankind, to lead them to salvation.

Characteristics of the Peetham
This peetham seeks transcendentalism. Unlike other Hindu Peethams, there are no dress regulations. The Peethadhipathi is not a celibate, but leads a family life. The essence of his teaching is "Bhukthi, Trupthi, Mukthi" (food for the body, satisfaction to the mind and salvation to the soul). Publicity is shunned. The Peetham's theme is that God is in man himself. It strives to make man a man by dispelling ignorance to make man discover God in himself and attain supreme knowledge. The Peetham acts on three principles: The Guru, the Mantra and the Sadhana. It insists on absolute faith in the Guru, who offers a Manthra to the devotees and expects them to do Sadhana on the Manthra to attain spiritual elevation. No distinction of class, caste, creed, religion or sex is made.

Membership
Anybody is free to enter the ashram and do his or her sadhana and can become a member of this peetham. This peetham has the intention of propagating dharma and endeavouring to draw out the divine qualities in man. Anyone who joins the peetham is free to adopt or follow their own religion, customs and traditions, or hold whichever personal views they wish, with no need for any sort of conversion.

Leadership
The spiritual leaders of the peetham are known as Peethadhipathis.

 Madin Kabir Sha was the first Peethadhipathi to come to Pithapuram and establish this spiritual organisation. He was a disciple of Abdul-Qadir Gilani (Phirane Pir), claimed to be the descendant and spiritual successor of Islamic prophet Muhammad. He had followed the preaching of his master, performed great penance and accomplished in it. He had number of disciples. It is said that his disciples had requested him to display a miracle in testimony of his divine power; they brought several cartloads of firewood, made a big pyre at the heart of the town and asked their Madin Kabir Sha to sit on it. He is said to have lain on the fire for about 24 hours comfortably, remaining unhurt. His ancestors had traveled from Baghdad to Persia, from there to Delhi, then to Hyderabad and then to Pithapuram.
 Madharsha Sathguru succeeded the peetham as the second peethadhipathi.
 Sri Hasan Miya Sha Sathguru succeeded the peetham as the third peethadhipathi.
 Kahenesha Vali succeeded as the Fourth Peethadhipathi. It is said that when he was about five years old his father, Sri Hasan Miya Sha, left his body and synthesized in cosmic eternity, so Kahenesha Vali was initiated by Sri Akhail- Ali- Sha Sathguru with the Mahamantra. Then with his master’s blessing He took over the lordship of the Peetham and became master to many disciples. Since then Sri Akhail- Ali- Sha Sathguru has been known as Vamsa Guru (The Preceptor of the Great master's Lineage). His monastery is in Tuni. At present there is an ashram there. The land was allotted by the Government of Andhra Pradesh to establish this peetham branch near the monastery. Kahenesha Vali was the author of Kaliki Bhgavatham, a book of Telugu spiritual songs.
 Brahmarishi Sri Mohiddin Badsha I Sathguru succeeded as the fifth Peethadhipathi. During his tenure there were around 8,000 disciples. He was a scholar of Telugu, Parsee and Sanskrit, and wrote many Telugu spiritual songs, known as Para Tathwa Kirtanalu, to promote devotion and spiritual knowledge, which are still sung by the members of the Institution.
 Kavisekhara Dr Umar Alisha (1885–1945) was the sixth Peethadhipathi of Sri Viswa Viznana Vidya Aadhyatmika Peetham, as well as a poet and politician. He was born on 28 February 1885 to Mohiddin Badusha and Chandbi at Pithapuram. He started writing poetry aged 14, and was a scholar of the Arabic, Persian, Urdu, English and Hindi languages.
 Brahmarishi Hussain Sha, born 9 September 1905 in Rajahmundry to Dr Umar Alisha-I and Akbar Begum, was the seventh Peethadhipathi. He wrote a theosophical text named Sha Tatvam, arguing that humanity is transformed into divinity, which is the essence of all religions. The words by which it is composed are of the Upanishad ( Divine inner voice or revelation ) heard during the process of Bhavaparinama (transformation of the feeling of "Self (I)" into the Cosmic Form). He also produced a translation of Sha philosophy into English.
 Sri Mohiddin Badsha II was born on 11 July 1933 at Pithapuram to Sri Hussain Sha and Ajeemunnisa Begum. He was a scholar in Telugu, Arabic, Urdu, Sanskrit, Parsee and English. He married Fatima Jaharunnisa Begum on 19 May 1963, and they had six sons and three daughters. Mohiddin Badsha took over the Lordship of Peetham as eighth head on 25 September 1981. Due to the old age and ill health of his father Hussain Sha Sathguru and as a future head of the institution, he had undertaken the preceptive of the Peetham's philosophy from 1969. He delivered speeches at many villages of Andhra Pradesh to promote Jnana yoga. He was the editor-in-chief of Adhyatmika Thatva Prabodham, a spiritual monthly magazine now called Thatwa Znanam”.  He delivered a speech on 12 April 1975 at Hyderabad during the World Telugu Conference. He died on 31 July 1989; his feretory is at the old ashram at Pithapuram. A compilation of his speeches was released under the name Tatwa Prabhodam, originally in Telugu but also translated into English with the title Precept Of Philosophy.
 Dr Umar Alisha II took over as ninth peethadhipathi in 1989 and is still in the post . He emphasises spiritual realisation over physical forms. Alongside his spiritual work he also works with various educational, social, and ethical causes, such as the Umar Alisha Akshara Jyothi literacy programme, which has taught thousands of illiterate people to read. Every year during the months of Viasakha and Karthika, Umar Alisha tours villages propagating dharma, national integration and world peace. He has written two books in English entitled Cosmic Wisdom and Nivedika ("An Appraisal").

References

External links
 Sri Viswa Viznana Website

Ashrams
Religious organisations based in India
Religious organizations established in the 15th century